The third season of the TV Land original sitcom Hot in Cleveland premiered on November 30, 2011. TV Land originally ordered 22 episodes but later increased the order to 24. The series stars Valerie Bertinelli, Wendie Malick, Jane Leeves, and Betty White.

Cast

Main
 Valerie Bertinelli as Melanie Moretti
 Jane Leeves as Rejoyla "Joy" Scroggs
 Wendie Malick as Victoria Chase
 Betty White as Elka Ostrovsky

Recurring
 John Mahoney as Roy
 Jon Lovitz as Artie, the Opera Guy

Special guest stars
 Don Rickles as Bobby  
 Kathie Lee Gifford as Christal
 Laura San Giacomo as Caroline
 Sandra Bernhard as Nan
 Sean Hayes as Chad
 Jennifer Love Hewitt as Emmy Chase
 Joe Jonas as Will
 Susan Lucci as herself
 Baron Davis as himself
 Huey Lewis as Johnny Revere
 Carl Reiner as Max
 Steven Weber as K.C.
 Edward Asner as Jameson
 Alex Borstein as Preshi
 Rhea Perlman as Jacki
 Georgia Engel as Mamie Sue Johnson
 Rick Springfield as Tom
 Andy Richter as Father Brian
 Paul Dooley as Bearded Man
 Kevin Nealon as George
 Joan Rivers as Anka
 Kristin Chenoweth as Courtney
 Cybill Shepherd as Apryl Sinclaire
 Barry Bostwick as Hugh
 Regis Philbin as Pierre
 David Spade as Christopher

Guest stars
 Kym Whitley as Jada
 Valerie Azlynn as Libby
 Gilles Marini as Captain Lebeau
 Orson Bean as Dan
 Marissa Jaret Winokur as Kim
 Kelly Schumann as Sally
 Yolanda Snowball as Pam
 Phil Morris as Lou
 Sean O'Bryan as Andy
 Bette Rae as Roy's Mother
 Tim Bagley as Larry
 David DeLuise as Jack
 Tim DeKay as Buddy
 Doug Savant as Scott
 Dan Cortese as Jimmy Armstrong
 Wendi McLendon-Covey as Nurse Sandy
 Willie Garson as Dr. Brotz
 Randy Wayne as Mark
 Ryan McPartlin as David
 Steve Valentine as Drago
 Dave Allen as David Gates
 Danielle Bisutti as Verena
 Curtis Armstrong as Clark
 Dan Gauthier as Nick
 Christopher Gorham as Casey
 James Patrick Stuart as Colin
 Reid Scott as Sam
 Echo Kellum as Aaron
 Maree Cheatham as Mrs. Filsinger
 D.C. Douglas as Peter Filsinger
 Craig Bierko as Donald
 Roger Bart as Jimmy
 Jonathan Silverman as Dr. Minton
 Rosa Blasi as Jessica
 Mel Rodriguez as Hector
 Francine York as Lady Natalie

Production 
On February 28, 2011, TV Land renewed the show for a third season to consist of 22 episodes. However, on March 21, 2011, the episode order for season three was increased from 22 to 24 episodes. This season premiered on November 30, 2011, and ran straight through until June 6, 2012.

Guest stars in season three include Kathie Lee Gifford, Sandra Bernhard, Laura San Giacomo, Gilles Marini, Don Rickles, Jennifer Love Hewitt, Joe Jonas, Huey Lewis, John Mahoney, Susan Lucci, Regis Philbin, Joan Rivers, Georgia Engel, Rhea Perlman, Roger Bart, Kevin Nealon, Craig Bierko, Josh Cribbs, Steven Weber, Ryan McPartlin, James Denton, Kristin Chenoweth, Rick Springfield, and Doug Savant.

Release 
Season three was released in Region 1 on November 27, 2012. The DVD includes all 24 episodes on 3 discs, and also features a "Some Like it Hot behind-the-scenes special".

Episodes

References 

General references 
 
 
 

2011 American television seasons
2012 American television seasons
Hot in Cleveland seasons